Pedro Costa is a Canadian television composer, and music producer. He first achieved notability in Poland where he received national airplay, and had two songs in the Polish singles chart.

Career

Projects
Driven by his passion for songwriting Pedro's solo recording debut came in 2008 with the Portuguese single "A beira da estrada". This was the followed by his first Alternative Rock EP "The Light".

Recorded in 2009, it has generated Pedro's biggest success to date. Discovered online by Polish radio producer and personality Piotr Baron the song went on to chart in Poland's singles chart. The Light reached a peek position of 11th on 5 May 2009 (see Charts). And was ranked 85th overall for 2009. According to Costa, "The Light" was also played nationally in Portugal by Rádio Renascença.

Some success also came in Costa's native Canada. In 2010 "Fooled Again?" was discovered by CBC radio producer Amanda Putz and featured on CBC Radio 1 show Bandwidth. The track also made the CBC radio 3 track of the day.
After several other singles releases and collaborative efforts his first full-length album "Discovery" was released March 2011.

Film and TV licensing
His first TV licensing deal came from an original rendition of the song, "God’s Gonna Cut You Down" on Discovery Channel's show "Weed Country".
In 2017 the critically acclaimed Netflix show 13 Reason Why used Pedro's song "Finding My Wings" on the show's soundtrack.

Discography

Solo Releases
Awake in a Dream (2019)
Made for TV (2015)
Discovery (2011)
Pie in the Sky (2010) (EP)
The Light (2009) (EP)

Fetal Pulse
Synthetica (2015) (EP)
Space (2013)
Cityscapes (2011)

Dove Pilot
Hearts of Summer (2017)
Dove Pilot (2015)

Charts

References

External links
Pedro Costa official site
Pedro Costa @ Last.fm
 

Year of birth missing (living people)
Living people
Canadian male singer-songwriters
Canadian folk singer-songwriters
Canadian rock singers
Ableton Live users
Canadian people of Portuguese descent
People from North Bay, Ontario
Canadian indie rock musicians
Musicians from Ontario